Vasily Nikolaevich Popov (born 3 April 1983) is a Russian painter, poet, and interpreter. He is a member of the Union of Writers of Russia, where he serves as Secretary of the board of directors. He is a recipient of the Bunin Award, the Lermontov Award, and the Grand Prix of the Golden Knight Literary Forum. As a painter, he is believed to be the first painter to have one of his works launched into space; the painting was simultaneously published on the Internet as an NFT.

Biography and artworks 
Popov was born on 3 April 1983 in Angarsk. After graduation from school got to Siberian Institute of Management (Novosibirsk) and graduated with diploma in 2005. Later, in 2010, he also graduated from Maxim Gorky Literature Institute in Moscow, where he currently resides.

Painter 

In 2020s he began to paint pictures, aside with his regular work as a poet. He created a series of artworks called Entities. He publishes and distributes his artwork from this series digitally as NFT entries, secured by blockchain technology. One of these "Entities" is a portrait of a cosmonaut. Vasily Popov managed to launch this painting in space in an attempt to become the first painter to launch NFT-published painting into Earth orbit.

Russian cosmonaut Oleg Artemyev agreed to take his painting with him in his regular ride to International Space Station. He started off with it from Baikonur cosmodrome on March 18, 2022. According to Popov, "the painting will later become a stellar book, where will be placed creative visions of space topic the thoughts of modern writers". The book is expected to be illustrated with photographs from space made by Oleg Artemyev while in spaceflight.

Poet 
He has published five poetry anthologies. Some of the poems were translated into Bulgarian, Chinese, Vietnamese and English. As an interpreter, Popov was the first to translate into Russian the Vietnamese poem "Lamentations of tormented soul" by poet Nguyễn Du.

His poetry was published in several literary magazines. Among them: "Our Contemporary" (Moscow), "Five Times five" (Moscow), "Novel-magazine XXI century" (Moscow), "Bratina" (Moscow), "Native Ladoga" (St. Petersburg), "Space" (Alma-Ata), "Priokskie Dawns" (Tula), "Russian Echo" (Samara), "Nevsky Almanac" (Rostov-on-Don), "New Yenisei Writer" (Krasnoyarsk), "Argamak" (Naberezhnye Chelny), "Trajectory of Creativity" (Kaluga), "Don" (Rostov-on-Don) and others.

Popov has received several literary awards, including the Bunin Award in 2012, the Lermontov Award in 2014, and a Grand Prix of the Golden Knight Literary Forum for the book Roads of Skies and Lands.

Maria Avvakumova, a Russian poet, characterized Popov's artwork:

Poet Nikolai Zinoviev evaluated the artwork of Popov  positively:

Books 

 2008 — "The Voice of Silence";
 2010 — "Berserk";
 2013 — "Roads of Skies and Lands";
 2015 — "This is my house".

Awards 

 2009 — Laureate of the All-Russian Poetry Prize "Falcons of the Russian Land";
 2011 — Winner of the first degree of the International Poetry Competition "Cranes over Russia";
 2012 — Grand Prix of the Golden Knight Literary Forum;
 2012 — Winner of the I. Bunin Prize;
 2014 — Winner of the M. Y. Lermontov Prize.

References

External links 
 Entities project

Russian poets
1983 births
Living people
21st-century Russian painters